The Men's 4×100 Medley Relay event at the 10th FINA World Aquatics Championships swam on 27 July 2003 at the Palau Sant Jordi in Barcelona, Spain. Preliminary heats swam during the day's morning session, with the top-8 teams advancing to swim again in a Final heat in the day's evening session.

At the start of the event, the existing World (WR) and Championship (CR) records were:
WR: 3:33.48 swum by the USA on August 29, 2002, in Yokohama, Japan
CR: 3:35.35 swum by Australia on July 28, 2001, in Fukuoka, Japan

Results

Final

Preliminaries

References

Swimming at the 2003 World Aquatics Championships